The C with bar (majuscule: Ꞓ, minuscule: ꞓ), also known as barred C, is a modified letter of the Latin alphabet, formed from C with the addition of a bar. It was used in the final version of the Unified Northern Alphabet, approved in 1932, for Saami, Selkup, Khanty, Evenki, Even, Nanai, Udege, Chukchi, Koryak and Nivkh languages  to denote the sound , although in some of these languages  in practice, several other alphabets were used.  Also, this letter was used in the Latinized Shugnan alphabet (1931-1939) to denote the sound .

The United States Federal Geographic Data Committee uses the capital barred C to represent the Cambrian Period in geologic history. In phonetic transcription, the lowercase barred C may denote a voiceless palatal fricative, and in 1963, it was proposed as a symbol for a voiceless flat postalveolar fricative  by William A. Smalley.

Computer encoding

See also
Ukrainian Ye (Є є)

References

Latin letters with diacritics
Phonetic transcription symbols